In the field of differential geometry in mathematics, mean curvature flow is an example of a geometric flow of hypersurfaces in a Riemannian manifold (for example, smooth surfaces in 3-dimensional Euclidean space). Intuitively, a family of surfaces evolves under mean curvature flow if the normal component of the velocity of which a point on the surface moves is given by the mean curvature of the surface.  For example, a round sphere evolves under mean curvature flow by shrinking inward uniformly (since the mean curvature vector of a sphere points inward).  Except in special cases, the mean curvature flow develops singularities.

Under the constraint that volume enclosed is constant, this is called surface tension flow.

It is a parabolic partial differential equation, and can be interpreted as "smoothing".

Existence and uniqueness
The following was shown by Michael Gage and Richard S. Hamilton as an application of Hamilton's general existence theorem for parabolic geometric flows.

Let  be a compact smooth manifold, let  be a complete smooth Riemannian manifold, and let  be a smooth immersion. Then there is a positive number , which could be infinite, and a map  with the following properties:
 
  is a smooth immersion for any 
 as  one has  in 

Convergence theorems
Following Hamilton's epochal 1982 work on the Ricci flow, in 1984 Gerhard Huisken employed the same methods for the mean curvature flow to produce the following analogous result:

Gage and Hamilton extended Huisken's result to the case . Matthew Grayson (1987) showed that if  is any smooth embedding, then the mean curvature flow with initial data  eventually consists exclusively of embeddings with strictly positive curvature, at which point Gage and Hamilton's result applies. In summary:
 If  is a smooth embedding, then consider the mean curvature flow  with initial data . Then  is a smooth embedding for every  and there exists  such that  has positive (extrinsic) curvature for every . If one selects the function  as in Huisken's result, then as  the embeddings  converge smoothly to an embedding whose image is a round circle.

Properties
The mean curvature flow extremalizes surface area, and minimal surfaces are the critical points for the mean curvature flow; minima solve the isoperimetric problem.

For manifolds embedded in a Kähler–Einstein manifold, if the surface is a Lagrangian submanifold, the mean curvature flow is of Lagrangian type, so the surface evolves within the class of Lagrangian submanifolds.

Huisken's monotonicity formula gives a monotonicity property of the convolution of a time-reversed heat kernel with a surface undergoing the mean curvature flow.

Related flows are:
 Curve-shortening flow, the one-dimensional case of mean curvature flow
 the surface tension flow
 the Lagrangian mean curvature flow
 the inverse mean curvature flow

Mean curvature flow of a three-dimensional surface

with  being a constant relating the curvature and the speed of the surface normal, and
the mean curvature being

parallel to the z axis, this reduces to a diffusion equation

While the conventional diffusion equation is a linear parabolic partial differential equation and does not develop
singularities (when run forward in time), mean curvature flow may develop singularities because it is a nonlinear parabolic equation.  In general additional constraints need to be put on a surface to prevent singularities under 
mean curvature flows.

Every smooth convex surface collapses to a point under the mean-curvature flow, without other singularities, and converges to the shape of a sphere as it does so. For surfaces of dimension two or more this is a theorem of Gerhard Huisken; for the one-dimensional curve-shortening flow it is the Gage–Hamilton–Grayson theorem. However, there exist embedded surfaces of two or more dimensions other than the sphere that stay self-similar as they contract to a point under the mean-curvature flow, including the Angenent torus.

Example: mean curvature flow of m-dimensional spheres

Due to the rotational symmetry of the sphere (or in general, due to the invariance of mean curvature under isometries) the mean curvature flow equation  reduces to the ordinary differential equation, for an initial sphere of radius ,

The solution of this ODE (obtained, e.g., by separation of variables) is 
, 

References

.
.
. See in particular Equations 3a and 3b.

Geometric flow
Differential geometry